Novak Djokovic defeated the defending champion Daniil Medvedev in the final, 4–6, 6–3, 6–3 to win the singles tennis title at the 2021 Paris Masters. It was his record-extending sixth Paris Masters title and record-breaking 37th ATP Tour Masters 1000 title overall, surpassing Rafael Nadal's tally in the latter category.

With his victory over Hubert Hurkacz in the semifinals, Djokovic also secured the year-end ATP No. 1 singles ranking for a record seventh time, breaking a tie with Pete Sampras in the process.

Seeds
The top eight seeds received a bye into the second round.

Draw

Finals

Top half

Section 1

Section 2

Bottom half

Section 3

Section 4

Qualifying

Seeds

Qualifiers

Lucky losers

Qualifying draw

First qualifier

Second qualifier

Third qualifier

Fourth qualifier

Fifth qualifier

Sixth qualifier

Seventh qualifier

References

External links
Main draw
Qualifying draw

Singles